The Lightle House was a historic house at 107 North Elm Street in Searcy, Arkansas.  It was a two-story wood-frame structure, with a gabled roof, stuccoed wood shingle exterior, and a foundation of brick piers.  It exhibited a combination of Craftsman and Colonial Revival elements, and was built in 1918.  It was considered one of the city's finest examples of Colonial Revival architecture.

The house was listed on the National Register of Historic Places in 1991.  It has been listed as destroyed in the Arkansas Historic Preservation Program database, and was delisted in 2018.

See also
Ben Lightle House (301 East Market Avenue, Searcy, Arkansas)
Lightle House (605 Race Avenue, Searcy, Arkansas)
Lightle House (County Road 76, Searcy, Arkansas)
William H. Lightle House (601 East Race Street, Searcy, Arkansas)
National Register of Historic Places listings in White County, Arkansas

References

Houses on the National Register of Historic Places in Arkansas
Colonial Revival architecture in Arkansas
Houses completed in 1918
Houses in Searcy, Arkansas
Demolished buildings and structures in Arkansas
National Register of Historic Places in Searcy, Arkansas
Former National Register of Historic Places in Arkansas
1918 establishments in Arkansas
Bungalow architecture in Arkansas
American Craftsman architecture in Arkansas